Hertfordshire was a county constituency covering the county of Hertfordshire in England.  It returned two Knights of the Shire to the House of Commons of England until 1707, then to the House of Commons of Great Britain until 1800, and to the House of Commons of the Parliament of the United Kingdom from 1800 until 1832. The Reform Act 1832 gave the county a third seat with effect from the 1832 general election.

Elections were held using the bloc vote system, when contested. However, even after the 1832 reforms, contested elections were the exception: of the 17 elections from 1832 to 1880, 9 were uncontested, including the 1880 general election. In such cases all the nominated candidates were returned without a vote.

History
The constituency consisted of the historic county of Hertfordshire. (Although Hertfordshire contained two boroughs, Hertford and St Albans, each of which elected two MPs in its own right, these were not excluded from the county constituency, and owning property within the borough could confer a vote at the county election.)

As in other county constituencies the franchise between 1430 and 1832 was defined by the Forty Shilling Freeholder Act, which gave the right to vote to every man who possessed freehold property within the county valued at £2 or more per year for the purposes of land tax; it was not necessary for the freeholder to occupy his land, nor even in later years to be resident in the county at all.

Except during the period of the Commonwealth, Hertfordshire has two MPs elected by the bloc vote method, under which each voter had two votes. In the nominated Barebones Parliament, two members represented Hertfordshire. In the First and Second Parliaments of Oliver Cromwell's Protectorate, however, there was a general redistribution of seats and Hertfordshire elected five members, while each of the boroughs had their representation reduced to a single MP. The traditional arrangements were restored from 1659.

General character of the constituency before the Reform Act
At the time of the Great Reform Act in 1832, Hertfordshire had a population of approximately 143,000, and was entirely agricultural in character, although there was a limited urban vote: at the election of 1805, when 2628 votes were cast, four towns (St Albans, Bishops Stortford, Ware and Hitchin) provided more than 100 votes each though none provided more than 160.

Elections were held at a single polling place, Hertford, and voters from the rest of the county had to travel to the county town to exercise their franchise; but in a physically small county like Hertfordshire, with good roads, this was less prohibitively expensive than in some others. (It was normal for voters to expect the candidates for whom they voted to meet their expenses in travelling to the poll, making the cost of a contested election substantial in many counties. Even in Hertfordshire, it was reported that accommodation and entertainment for the voters at the county meeting in September 1774 cost the candidates £4,000; and that was merely a meeting to discuss the candidates and see if consensus could be reached without the need for a contest – the cost of the poll the following month, that in the end could not be averted, was on top of this.)

Contested elections were relatively frequent (there were contests at 13 of the 28 general elections between 1701 and 1831), and were often vigorously fought – the voters valued their independence, and at least from the middle of the 18th century no landed interests had much influence over them, although fifty years earlier the local gentry reckoned to return one of the two MPs without opposition.

The by-election of 1805
Peter Jupp includes in his collection of documents relating to elections round the turn of the 19th century a contemporary account of the Hertfordshire by-election, written by one of the candidates, William Baker, which gives a vivid picture of electioneering in the county at this period. The election was a straight fight between Baker and Hon. Thomas Brand to fill the vacancy left by the death of Hon. Peniston Lamb; Baker had been the county's MP until three years previously, and was backed by Pitt and his government, while Brand had particular support among the religious dissenters.

Baker's campaign took the form of a personal canvass of the voters, by visiting every town and village of any size in the county, if possible on market day: Hertford on the 26th; Ware on the 28th; then Watton; Stevenage; Hitchin and Baldock on the same day; and so through the whole of Hertfordshire in two weeks, over snow-bound roads with even the high road between St Albans and Berkhamsted barely passable in places. He travelled mostly on horseback, his carriage "attending me as it could at intervals by the great roads, and meeting me at the places where I was to sleep". In most of the county he had already pledges of solid support (he records that at Stevenage he had "nothing to do but go round... and thank the voters for their promises already made in my favour to their Rector"), and where possible in each place he was met by the local magnates who joined him in his canvassing to demonstrate their support.

The informality of the election itself seems strange today. After the candidates had made their final speeches at Hertford, the Sheriff took a show of hands and could have ended the proceedings there  and then, had the candidates been content; but, Brand demanding the poll that was his right everybody proceeded to the hustings. Voting thus began around one in the afternoon. The poll was continued on the second day, the arrangement being that voting would be from eight o'clock until three, but ended as soon as Brand admitted defeat, some half-an-hour before the agreed deadline. By this time Baker had 1,556 votes and Brand only 1,076, and plainly he felt he had too few supporters unpolled to have any hope of making up the deficit.

The election ended in typically rumbustious fashion. Baker having been declared the victor, his supporters celebrated by chairing their candidate round the town, but
"Wilshere's coachman... had the insolence to drive his master's carriage full speed through the crowd at the time of chairing, to the risk of the lives of hundreds. Providentially, however, no person was materially injured. Brand made an apology to me afterwards by letter for the outrage, and Wilshere, though not at my desire, has since turned the servant away..."- Letter of William Baker to his son, 22 February 1805, in Hertfordshire County Records Office, quoted by Jupp, op cit

After the Reform Act
In 1832, the Great Reform Act increased the county's representation from two to three MPs (a change that had not been in the original Reform Bill of 1830 but was adopted the following year), as well as making minor boundary changes. (One parish, Coleshill, was transferred to Buckinghamshire.) The extension of the franchise to tenants-at-will, copyholders and leaseholders increased the electorate a little, but the 4,245 electors registered in 1832 was not much higher than the 4,000 qualified voters who have been estimated for 1754. However, the electorate grew by almost half over the next thirty years, and the extension of the franchise in 1868 increased the electorate still further, to more than 9,000.

Abolition
The borough of St Albans was disenfranchised for corruption in 1852 and the borough of Hertford was reduced to single-member representation by the 1867 Reform Act. Under the Redistribution of Seats Act 1885, the borough of Hertford ceased to exist, and the county of Hertfordshire was divided into four new single-member constituencies: the Mid or St Albans division of Hertfordshire, the Eastern or Hertford division, the Northern or Hitchin division and the Western or Watford division.

Members of Parliament

MPs 1290–1640

MPs 1640–1653

MPs 1654–1658

MPs 1659–1832

MPs 1832–1885

Election results

Elections in the 1830s

Elections in the 1840s

 
 
 

Grimston succeeded to the peerage, becoming 2nd Earl of Verulam and causing a by-election.

Elections in the 1850s

 
 
 
 
 

Halsey's death caused a by-election.

 

 
 
 

Bulwer-Lytton was appointed Secretary of State for the Colonies, requiring a by-election.

Elections in the 1860s
Puller's death caused a by-election.

 

 
 

Bulwer-Lytton was elevated to the peerage, becoming Lord Lytton and causing a by-election.

Elections in the 1870s

Elections in the 1880s

References 
Notes

D Brunton & D H Pennington, Members of the Long Parliament (London: George Allen & Unwin, 1954)
 John Cannon, Parliamentary Representation 1832 – England and Wales (Cambridge: Cambridge University Press, 1973)
 Cobbett's Parliamentary history of England, from the Norman Conquest in 1066 to the year 1803 (London: Thomas Hansard, 1808) 
F W S Craig, British Parliamentary Election Results 1832–1885 (2nd edition, Aldershot: Parliamentary Research Services, 1989)
 Peter Jupp, British and Irish Elections 1784–1831 (Newton Abbott: David & Charles, 1973)
 Lewis Namier & John Brooke, The History of Parliament: The House of Commons 1754–1790 (London: HMSO, 1964)
 J E Neale, The Elizabethan House of Commons (London: Jonathan Cape, 1949)
 J Holladay Philbin, Parliamentary Reform 1640–1832  (New Haven: Yale University Press, 1965)
 Robert Walcott, English Politics in the Early Eighteenth Century (Oxford: Oxford University Press, 1956)
 British History Online – Parliamentary papers
 

Parliamentary constituencies in Hertfordshire (historic)
Constituencies of the Parliament of the United Kingdom established in 1290
Constituencies of the Parliament of the United Kingdom disestablished in 1885